Marian Catholic College is an independent Roman Catholic co-educational secondary day school, in  in the Riverina region of New South Wales, Australia. Administered by the Roman Catholic Diocese of Wagga Wagga, the college caters to students from Year 7 to Year 12. It is called "Marian" in honour of Mary, the Mother of God, patron of the Sisters of Mercy and Marist Brothers who founded the college.

Years Seven and Eight are part of the Middle School years, Years Nine and Ten the School Certificate years and Years Eleven and Twelve the Senior School when Preliminary and Higher School Certificate Courses are completed. Students with satisfactory attendance and progress receive their School Certificate at the end of Year Ten and their HSC at the end of Year Twelve.

Facilities 
The school features 2 fully renovated kitchens for food technology and hospitality, a large enclosed hall used for indoor sports and gatherings and two computer rooms, and further computers in the school's library and classrooms. The school's outdoor sporting facilities include an oval, a netball court, a basketball court (within the same enclosure).

Music 
Marian Catholic College's school band "PowerSauce" was created in late 2008. They formed to participate in the Ashton Music's "Best School Band" competition. The competition ran until 12 June and PowerSauce finished 3rd out of 22. They were placed in the top 5 for Sony Music to overlook, where the final winner would be judged. On 17 June 2009, it was announced that PowerSauce had won the nationwide competition, earning them a prize of Ashton Music equipment and a performance by Australian musician Jessica Mauboy. Since then, the band has split, due to work and university commitments.

Sporting
Marian Catholic College hosts annual swimming, cross country and athletics carnivals. The swimming carnival is held early in term 1 at the Griffith Aquatic Centre and the athletics carnival is held later in the term at the West End Oval. The school's students are divided into four houses for these carnivals and points are given to each house based on student participation and placement in each event. The four sporting houses of McAuley, Patrick, Marcellin and Brendan are named after the founders of the school. High performing students can progress to regional, zone and state carnivals after the school carnivals (BISSA).

The School also annually enters teams into:
 Cudmore Shield (cricket)
 Berg and Downie Shield (cricket)
 Bill Turner Cup (soccer)
 Cochrane and Riverina Cup (rugby league)
 Combined Catholic Colleges Competitions [CCC] (athletics, swimming, cross country, basketball, netball, touch football, soccer, golf, hockey, Australian rules football)

Notable alumni
 Adrian Piccoli – MP for Murrumbidgee
 Joany Badenhorst - Paralympic athlete for para-snowboarding cross

References

External links

Griffith, New South Wales
Catholic secondary schools in New South Wales
Sisters of Mercy schools
1921 establishments in Australia
Roman Catholic Diocese of Wagga Wagga
Educational institutions established in 1921
Education in the Riverina